A constitutional referendum was held in Seychelles on 18 June 1993, following the failure of a referendum the previous year to pass the 60% threshold required. After the new constitution had been redrafted, it was put to a public vote for a second time, receiving the approval of 73.6% of voters.

Results

References

1993 referendums
1993 in Seychelles
Referendums in Seychelles
Constitutional referendums